Sialum is a Papuan language of Sialum Rural LLG, Morobe Province, Papua New Guinea.

References

Languages of Morobe Province
Huon languages